Polydiketoenamine (PDK) is a polymer discovered in 2019 that can be recycled over and over without loss of performance. Researchers at Lawrence Berkeley National Laboratory studied PDK and published the results of the study in Nature Chemistry in April 2019. Submersion in an acidic solution breaks down the polymer to its original monomers and separates the monomers from additives.

See also
Enamine

References

Organic polymers
Lawrence Berkeley National Laboratory